The Quinnipiac Bobcats represent Quinnipiac University in ECAC Hockey. The Bobcats were not able to qualify for the NCAA tournament for the first time in school history. The Bobcats won more than 20 games for the first time in program history (setting a program record with 22 victories) and reached the ECAC Hockey semifinals.

Offseason

Recruiting

Exhibition

News and notes

October
Kelly Babstock tallied one goal (the first of the season) and one assist in a 3–0 victory over Niagara. On October 2, she scored a goal and two assists in a 3–1 win over Niagara.
Kate Wheeler scored two goals in a 3–0 victory against Niagara on October 1. The next day, she picked up an assist in a 3–1 victory over Niagara
Erica Uden Johansson scored one goal and had one assist on October 9 against the Northeastern in a 4–0 win. The following day, Johansson had three goals against Sacred Heart in a 5–0 victory.
In the first two games, Victoria Vigilanti made a total of 44 saves on 45 shots. On October 1, she stopped 20 shots in a 3–0 shutout of Niagara. The next day, she made 24 saves in a 3–1 win versus Niagara.
On October 9, Victoria Vigilanti made 27 saves for her second shutout of the season. It was a 4–0 win over Northeastern. The following day, she turned away 13 shots in a 5–0 victory against Sacred Heart. She turned away 40 of 40 shots.
 October 15–16: Regan Boulton registered three goals and two assist. In a 4–2 win versus the Maine Black Bears, she registered her first-career hat trick.

November
 November 12–13: Kelly Babstock made Quinnipiac hockey history as she accounted for six of the seven goals scored over the weekend. Babstock registered back to back hat tricks against ECAC opponents (No. 10 ranked Harvard and Dartmouth). In addition, she is the first skater in Quinnipiac history to record two hat tricks in one season. As of November 14, Babstock led the team and the entire NCAA in goals (13) and points (27).
Nov. 26:In the first game of the Nutmeg Classic, Quinnipiac beat Sacred Heart by a 9–1 tally. Kelly Babstock had two goals and four assists to set the school record for points (6) in a game. In addition, she set season records in points (30) and assists (17).
Nov. 27: In the championship game of the Nutmeg Classic, Quinnipiac defeated Yale by a 2–1 mark. Brittany Lyons scored the game-winning goal as the Bobcats clinched its second ever Nutmeg Classic.

December
On Friday, Dec 3 against Brown, Kelly Babstock became Quinnipiac's all-time leader in goals scored in a season by netting her 16th goal of the season. Babstock's nation leading sixth game-winning goal against Yale on Saturday, Dec 4 was part of a Bobcats 3–1 win. Vigilanti made a combined total of 39 saves in both weekend Bobcats’ victories. On Friday, Dec 3 against Brown, she turned away 17 shots in a 40 victory to earn her league-high fifth shutout of the season. On Saturday, Dec 4 against Yale, she made 22 saves in a 31 win recording her 12th victory of the season (1261).
December 14: Quinnipiac women's ice hockey assistant coach Cassandra Turner was selected to serve as assistant coach for Canada at the 2011 IIHF World Women's Under-18 Championship.

January
January 8: Kelly Babstock scored a hat trick, including the game-winning marker at 3:25 in overtime. Her goal lifted the Bobcats to a come from behind victory over ECAC Hockey opponent Clarkson.
Kelly Babstock was featured in Sports Illustrated's Faces in the Crowd feature in the January 17, 2011 issue (as recognition of breaking several Quinnipiac scoring records).

Regular season

Standings

Schedule

Conference record

Postseason
Victoria Vigilanti, Finalist, ECAC Goaltender of the Year Award

Awards and honors
Kelly Babstock, MLX Skates Rookie of the Week (Week of October 5)
Kelly Babstock, MLX Skates Rookie of the Week, (Week of November 16) 
Kelly Babstock, MLX Skates Player of the Week (Week of December 7) 
Kelly Babstock, MLX Skates Rookie of the Week (Week of December 7)
 Kelly Babstock, MLX Skates Player of the Week (Week of February 15, 2011)
 Kelly Babstock, MLX Skates Rookie of the Week (Week of February 15, 2011)
Kelly Babstock, 2011 Patty Kazmaier Award Nominee
Kelly Babstock, 2010–11 ECAC Player of the Year
Kelly Babstock, 2010–11 New England Women's Division I All-Star
Erica Uden Johansson, MLX Skates Player of the Week (Week of October 12)
Erica Uden Johansson, MLX Skates Rookie of the Week (Week of October 12)
Victoria Vigilanti, MLX Skates Defensive Player of the Week (Week of October 5)
Victoria Vigilanti, MLX Skates Defensive Player of the Week (Week of October 12)
Victoria Vigilanti, MLX Skates Goaltender of the Week Week (Week of December 7) 
Victoria Vigilanti, MLX Skates Defensive Player of the Week (Week of February 8, 2011)
Victoria Vigilanti, MLX Skates Defensive Player of the Week (Week of March 1, 2011)
Kate Wheeler, MLX Skates Player of the Week (Week of October 5)
Kate Wheeler, MLX Skates Player of the Week (Week of October 26)

Team awards
Kelly Babstock, 2010–11 Quinnipiac women's ice hockey Rookie of the Year 
Kelly Babstock, 2010–11 Quinnipiac women's ice hockey Most Valuable Player
Bethany Dymarczyk, Most Outstanding Defensive Player
Kelley Davies, Coaches Award
Melissa Perry, Scholar-Athlete of the Year

See also
2009–10 Quinnipiac Bobcats women's ice hockey season

References

Q
Q
Quinnipiac Bobcats women's ice hockey seasons